Abundio is a given name. Notable people with the name include:

Abundio Martínez (1875–1914), Mexican musician and composer
Abundio Peregrino García (born 1953), Mexican politician
Abundio Sagástegui Alva (1932–2012), Peruvian plant taxonomist

Spanish masculine given names